John Louis Lucaites (born 1952) is an American academic. He is a professor emeritus of rhetoric and public culture at Indiana University. In 2012, Lucaites was appointed as associate dean for arts and humanities and undergraduate education at Indiana University. His research concerns the general relationship between rhetoric and social theory, and seeks to contribute in particular to the critique and reconstruction of liberalism in contemporary social, political, and cultural practices in the United States.

Education
Lucaites obtained a BA in 1974 from Rutgers College, an MA in 1975 from the University of North Carolina at Chapel Hill, and a PhD in 1984 from the University of Iowa.

Awards
Douglas W. Ehninger Distinguished Rhetorical Scholar Award of the National Communication Association, 2014, "for his work on civil rights rhetorics and in visual rhetorics"
Diamond Anniversary Book Award and James A. Winans-Herbert A. Wichelns Memorial Award for Distinguished Scholarship in Rhetoric and Public Address, National Communication Association, 2008, both for No caption needed
Golden Anniversary Monograph Award, National Communications Association, 2004, for Robert Hariman and John Louis Lucaites, “Public Identity and Collective Memory in U.S. Iconic Photography: The Image of ‘Accidental Napalm’,” Critical Studies in Media Communication, 20 (2003): 35-66.
Golden Anniversary Monograph Award, National Communications Association, 2002, for Robert Hariman and John Louis Lucaites, “Dissent and Emotional Management in a Liberal-Democratic Society: The Kent State Iconic Photograph,” Rhetoric and Society Quarterly, 31 (2001): 5-32.
Golden Anniversary Monograph Award, National Communications Association, 1997, for Marouf Hasian, Celeste M. Condit, and John L. Lucaites, “The Rhetorical Boundaries of ‘the Law’: A Consideration of the Rhetorical Culture of Legal Practice and the Case of the ‘Separate But Equal’ Doctrine,” Quarterly Journal of Speech, 82 (1996): 323-342.

Books

References

External links

Living people
1952 births
Indiana University faculty
University of Iowa alumni
University of North Carolina at Chapel Hill alumni
Rutgers University alumni
20th-century American male writers
21st-century American male writers